James Johnson (born 21 January 1939) is an American politician from Iowa.

Johnson was born in Jerico, Iowa, on 21 January 1939 to parents Alvie and Gertrude. After graduating from Elma High School in 1958, he enrolled at North Iowa Area Community College. From 1961 to 1965, Johnson served in the United States Air Force. He completed his degree at the University of Northern Iowa in 1972. Starting in 1973, Johnson ran a grocery store. He won election to the Iowa House of Representatives for the first time in 1978, and was reelected in 1980. Johnson was a Republican and represented District 14.

References

1939 births
Living people
20th-century American politicians
People from Chickasaw County, Iowa
University of Northern Iowa alumni
Republican Party members of the Iowa House of Representatives
American grocers
United States Air Force airmen
People from Howard County, Iowa